Muhammad Mallya Beg Khan, also known as Malla-Khan, was the Khan of Kokand from 1858 to 1862; he was the son of Murad Beg Khan and the stepbrother of Khudayar Khan.  He was assassinated in 1862 and succeeded by his seventeen-year-old stepbrother Shah Murad Khan, who ruled for only several days until Muhammad Khudayar Khan came back to power.

During his rule the land of the present-day city of Bishkek was annexed to the Khanate and expanded construction projects on the Chu River.  His regent Alimqul controlled many affairs of the Khanate and was to some extent it's de facto ruler.

In 1859 the Russians occupied Fort Julek, which according to Russian governor-general of Orenburg, was to protect Fort Perovski; In 1861 they rebuilt the fortress and demolished the Yani Kurgan fortress.  As Kokand gradually expanded their dominion North into the area occupied by Kazakhs subject and to Tokmak, and others that had already occupied, relations with Russia further deteriorated into an all out war.

Dissatisfaction with high taxes and Alimqul's hostility towards the population of Kokand led to Mallakhan's overthrow and replacement by Shah Murad Khan.

References 

Khans of Kokand
1812 births
1862 deaths
19th-century monarchs in Asia
19th-century murdered monarchs